Jerry Lanston "Lanny" Wadkins Jr. (born December 5, 1949) is an American professional golfer. He ranked in the top 10 of the Official World Golf Ranking for 86 weeks from the ranking's debut in 1986 to 1988.

Early years
Born in Richmond, Virginia, Wadkins attended Meadowbrook High School, then Wake Forest University on an Arnold Palmer golf scholarship. He won the U.S. Amateur in 1970 in Oregon, one stroke ahead of runner-up Tom Kite, and turned professional in 1971.

PGA Tour
Wadkins' first win on the PGA Tour came at the Sahara Invitational in Las Vegas in October 1972, where he finished one stroke ahead of runner-up Palmer, his scholarship benefactor. Wadkins was later voted Rookie of the Year on the tour in 1972. Two more wins followed in 1973 before his form dipped for three years. He bounced back to win his sole major title at the PGA Championship in 1977. He prevailed on the third hole of a sudden-death playoff at Pebble Beach against Gene Littler. It was the first time the sudden-death format was used in a stroke-play major championship.

Wadkins was runner-up in four subsequent majors (U.S. Open in 1986, PGA Championship in 1982, 1984, 1987), and finished third in the Masters three times (1990, 1991, 1993). In The Open Championship, his best finish was fourth at St. Andrews in 1984.

On the PGA Tour, Wadkins won The Players Championship at Sawgrass in 1979 and was voted PGA Player of the Year in 1985. Over his career, he picked up a win more seasons than not until 1992, when he achieved his twenty-first and final PGA Tour victory at the Canon Greater Hartford Open. 

Like many star American golfers Wadkins was invited to play in a number of international tournaments. He won the 1978 Victorian PGA Championship, an event in Australia, and the 1979 Bridgestone Open, an event on the Japan Golf Tour. He also finished runner-up at the 1979 German Open, 1980 Air New Zealand Shell Open, and 1990 Austrian Open. He also won unofficial events in South America, Canada, and Japan.

Wadkins played for the United States in the Ryder Cup eight times between 1977 and 1993, which ties the highest number of appearances in the competition by an American, alongside Raymond Floyd and Billy Casper (Phil Mickelson and Jim Furyk have since made ten and nine appearances, respectively). Wadkins collected 21 points during his Ryder Cup career, one of the very best records on either side in the history of the competition. He also captained the team in 1995 at Oak Hill Country Club.

Champions Tour
Wadkins began play on the Champions Tour in 2000, and picked up a win in his first event at the ACE Group Classic in a four-way playoff. As a senior, he divided his time between competition and broadcasting work with CBS Sports and did not become a regular winner at the senior level.

Television
Following the retirement of Ken Venturi in June 2002, Wadkins was the lead analyst for CBS for over four years, until he was replaced by Nick Faldo after the 2006 season. He is currently the lead analyst for the Champions Tour on Golf Channel.

Known for constantly saying “Billy Ray” during his commentary. Billy Ray Brown is an on-course commentator.

Hall of Fame
Wadkins was elected to the World Golf Hall of Fame in 2009.

Personal
Wadkins' younger brother, Bobby, currently plays on the Champions Tour. Lanny is married to Penelope Wadkins and has three children: Jessica, Travis, and Tucker. Travis played on the Wake Forest University golf team 2006–2010.  Tucker played on the University of Arizona golf team from 2011–2015. In 2011, Travis played on the eGolf Tour and made it to the final stage of the PGA Tour's Qualifying School but failed to earn a card. A nephew, Ron Whittaker, is a professional golfer on the second-tier Web.com Tour with 77 PGA Tour starts.

Amateur wins
1968 Southern Amateur
1969 Eastern Amateur
1970 U.S. Amateur, Southern Amateur, Western Amateur

Professional wins (33)

PGA Tour wins (21)

PGA Tour playoff record (3–3)

European Tour wins (1)

European Tour playoff record (1–2)

Japan Golf Tour wins (1)

PGA Tour of Australasia wins (1)

Canadian Tour wins (1)

Other wins (8)
1971 Virginia Open, Greater Bangor Open
1980 PGA Grand Slam of Golf (United States - unofficial event)
1981 Caribbean Open (Colombia)
1984 World Nissan Championship (Japan)
1990 Fred Meyer Challenge (with Bobby Wadkins)
1991 Shark Shootout (with Tom Purtzer)
2015 PNC Father Son Challenge (with son Tucker)

Senior PGA Tour wins (1)

Senior PGA Tour playoff record (1–0)

Major championships

Wins (1)

1Defeated Littler with a par on the third extra hole.

Results timeline

CUT = missed the halfway cut (3rd round cut in 1985 Open Championship)
"T" indicates a tie for a place.

Summary

Most consecutive cuts made – 13 (1985 PGA – 1989 Masters)
Longest streak of top-10s – 3 (twice)

The Players Championship

Wins (1)

Results timeline

CUT = missed the halfway cut
WD = withdrew
"T" indicates a tie for a place.

U.S. national team appearances
Amateur
Walker Cup: 1969 (winners), 1971
Eisenhower Trophy: 1970 (winners)

Professional
Ryder Cup: 1977 (winners), 1979 (winners), 1983 (winners), 1985, 1987, 1989 (tie), 1991 (winners), 1993 (winners), 1995 (captain)
World Cup: 1977, 1984, 1985
Dunhill Cup: 1986
Four Tours World Championship: 1985 (winners), 1987 (winners), 1991
US v Japan: 1982, 1983

See also
1971 PGA Tour Qualifying School graduates
List of golfers with most PGA Tour wins
List of men's major championships winning golfers

References

External links

Golf Channel: Lanny Wadkins

American male golfers
Wake Forest Demon Deacons men's golfers
PGA Tour golfers
PGA Tour Champions golfers
Ryder Cup competitors for the United States
Winners of men's major golf championships
World Golf Hall of Fame inductees
Golf writers and broadcasters
Golfers from Virginia
Sportspeople from Richmond, Virginia
Golfers from Dallas
1949 births
Living people